The Forty-Ninth Wisconsin Legislature convened from  to  in regular session.  During this term, legislative business was largely held in the north wing of the Wisconsin State Capitol, which was the only part of the capitol to remain intact after the 1904 fire.

Senators representing even-numbered districts were newly elected for this session and were serving the first two years of a four-year term. Assembly members were elected to a two-year term. Assembly members and even-numbered senators were elected in the general election of November 3, 1908. Senators representing odd-numbered districts were serving the third and fourth year of a four-year term, having been elected in the general election of November 6, 1906.

Major events
 March 4, 1909: 
 After a contentious two-month process, Isaac Stephenson was re-elected as United States senator by the Wisconsin Legislature in joint session.
 Inauguration of William Howard Taft as the 27th President of the United States.
 August 2, 1909: The United States Signal Corps Aeronautical Division purchased the world's first military airplane, the Wright Military Flyer.
 November 13, 1909: "On, Wisconsin!" was played for the first time at a University of Wisconsin football game against the University of Minnesota.  The song would become the official fight song of the University of Wisconsin and the official state song of the state of Wisconsin.
 March 17, 1910: Progressive Republicans in the United States House of Representatives allied with Democrats to remove speaker Joseph Gurney Cannon from the House Rules Committee and strip him of his power to appoint committee chairmen.
 September 1, 1910: Wisconsin Supreme Court justice Joshua Eric Dodge resigned from the court.
 September 10, 1910: Governor James O. Davidson appointed Wisconsin circuit judge Aad J. Vinje to the Wisconsin Supreme Court to replace Joshua Eric Dodge.
 November 8, 1910: 1910 Wisconsin elections:
 Francis E. McGovern elected Governor of Wisconsin.
 Wisconsin voters approved an amendment to the state constitution so that redistricting should only occur after a federal census.
 Wisconsin voters rejected an amendment to the state constitution to double compensation for state legislators.
 Wisconsin voters approved an amendment which would have enabled more state funding of public improvements, but the referendum was later ruled invalid by the Wisconsin Supreme Court.
 November 20, 1910: Francisco I. Madero called for an armed revolution against Mexican president/dictator Porfirio Díaz, initiating the Mexican Revolution.

Major legislation
 Joint Resolution to amend section 21 of article 4 of the constitution, relating to compensation of members of the legislature, 1909 Joint Resolution 7.  Second legislative passage of the proposed amendment to the state constitution to double compensation for state legislators.  The amendment was rejected by voters in the 1910 election.
 Joint Resolution memorializing congress in regard to international peace, 1909 Joint Resolution 19.  Endorsed the idea of an international parliament for preservation of peace.
 Joint Resolution relating to the capitol building, 1909 Joint Resolution 30.  Requested that the city of Madison enact controls to reduce coal pollution to maintain the beauty of the new capitol building, which was then under construction.
 Joint Resolution to amend section 10, article VII of the constitution, relating to the salary of judges, 1909 Joint Resolution 34. Proposed an amendment to the state constitution to allow the Legislature to set judicial salaries by law.
 Joint Resolution to amend section 6, article VIII of the constitution, relating to limitation on the public debt, 1909 Joint Resolution 37.  Proposed an amendment to the state constitution to expand the reasons for which cities or counties could incur debt, but requiring that a payment schedule would be implemented that would have the debt repaid within 50 years.
 Joint Resolution to amend article 11 of the constitution by adding thereto a new section to be known as Section 3a, relating to the acquisition of lands by the state or any of its cities for certain public purposes, 1909 Joint Resolution 38.  Proposed an amendment to the state constitution to allow cities to acquire land for the purposes of creating or enlarging public parks, public squares, streets, public buildings, etc.
 Joint Resolution to amend section 3 of article XI of .the constitution, relating to municipal corporations and their indebtedness, 1909 Joint Resolution 44.  Proposed an amendment to the state constitution to create an exemption to the 5% limit on municipal debt for municipalities larger than 150,000 people where the debt is being used for the purchase of land for public improvements.
 Joint Resolution providing an amendment to section 3 of article IV of the Constitution of the State of Wisconsin, relating to apportionment, 1909 Joint Resolution 55.  Second legislative passage of the proposed amendment to the state constitution to only perform redistricting following a federal census.  This amendment was ratified by voters in the Fall 1910 general election.

Party summary

Senate summary

Assembly summary

Sessions
 1st Regular session: January 13, 1909June 18, 1909

Leaders

Senate leadership
 President of the Senate: William D. Connor (R)
 President pro tempore: James Huff Stout (R–Menomonie)

Assembly leadership
 Speaker of the Assembly: Levi H. Bancroft (R–Richland Center)

Members

Members of the Senate
Members of the Senate for the Forty-Ninth Wisconsin Legislature:

Members of the Assembly
Members of the Assembly for the Forty-Ninth Wisconsin Legislature:

Committees

Senate committees
 Senate Committee on AgricultureI. T. Bishop, chair
 Senate Committee on Banks and InsuranceW. C. Owen, chair
 Senate Committee on EducationJ. H. Stout, chair
 Senate Committee on ElectionsH. C. Martin, chair
 Senate Committee on Engrossed BillsT. Burke, chair
 Senate Committee on Federal RelationsE. E. Lyons, chair
 Senate Committee on the JudiciaryA. W. Sanborn, chair
 Senate Committee on Legislative Expenditures and EmployeesT. Morris, chair
 Senate Committee on Manufacturers and LaborT. W. Brazeau, chair
 Senate Committee on Military AffairsD. G. James, chair
 Senate Committee on Public HealthH. W. Barker, chair
 Senate Committee on Roads and BridgesE. E. Browne, chair
 Senate Committee on State AffairsG. E. Page, chair
 Senate Committee on TaxationJ. M. Whitehead, chair
 Senate Committee on Towns and CountiesJ. A. Fridd, chair
 Senate Committee on TransportationH. M. Lockney, chair
 Senate Committee on Villages and CitiesJ. A. Wright, chair

Assembly committees
 Assembly Committee on AgricultureG. U. Fisher, chair
 Assembly Committee on Banks and InsuranceF. W. Kubasta, chair
 Assembly Committee on CitiesC. E. Estabrook, chair
 Assembly Committee on Dairy and FoodT. Reynolds, chair
 Assembly Committee on DamsJ. S. Stack, chair
 Assembly Committee on EducationS. F. Wehrwein, chair
 Assembly Committee on ElectionsW. Ingalls, chair
 Assembly Committee on Engrossed BillsH. E. Roethe, chair
 Assembly Committee on Federal RelationsC. B. Culbertson, chair
 Assembly Committee on the JudiciaryL W. Ledvina, chair
 Assembly Committee on Legislative Expenditures and EmployeesJ. E. Thomas, chair
 Assembly Committee on LibrariesD. B. Stevens, chair
 Assembly Committee on Lumber and MiningP. Whitman, chair
 Assembly Committee on Manufactures and LaborS. Smith, chair
 Assembly Committee on Military AffairsW. Disch, chair
 Assembly Committee on Public HealthW. Irvine, chair
 Assembly Committee on Public ImprovementsH. Laycock, chair
 Assembly Committee on Roads and BridgesC. C. Wellensgard, chair
 Assembly Committee on State AffairsG. E. Scott, chair
 Assembly Committee on TaxationM. J. Cleary, chair
 Assembly Committee on Third ReadingW. Reader, chair
 Assembly Committee on Towns and CountiesJ. C. Chapple, chair
 Assembly Committee on TransportationE. W. LeRoy, chair
 Assembly Committee on VillagesG. T. Atwood, chair

Joint committees
 Joint Committee on the CapitolJ. S. Donald (Sen.) & F. Smith (Asm.), co-chairs
 Joint Committee on Charitable and Penal InstitutionsS. M. Marsh (Sen.) & J. R. Jones (Asm.), co-chairs
 Joint Committee on ClaimsG. B. Hudnall (Sen.) & L. C. Whittet (Asm.), co-chairs
 Joint Committee on Enrolled BillsJ. C. Kleczka (Sen.) & F. R. Zimmerman (Asm.), co-chairs
 Joint Committee on Fish and GameJ. W. Thomas (Sen.) & F. Hammill (Asm.), co-chairs
 Joint Committee on ForestryH. P. Bird (Sen.) & W. M. Bray (Asm.), co-chairs
 Joint Committee on PrintingJ. E. Lehr (Sen.) & J. A. Chinnock (Asm.), co-chairs
 Joint Committee on RevisionJ. J. Blaine (Sen.) & J. E. McConnell (Asm.), co-chairs
 Joint Committee on RulesJ. H. Stout (Sen.) & F. J. Kimball (Asm.), co-chairs
 Joint Committee on State DepartmentsH. Krumrey (Sen.) & D. C. Coolidge (Asm.), co-chairs
 Special Joint Committee on ApportionmentJ. M. Whitehead (Sen.) & C. A. Ingram (Asm.), co-chairs

Employees

Senate employees
 Chief Clerk: F. E. Andrews
 Journal Clerk: R. E. Smith
 Assistant Journal Clerk: George M. McLaughlin
 Bookkeeper: Fred M. Wylie
 Assistant Bookkeeper: J. T. Huntington
 Engrossing Clerk: John Bessey
 Index Clerk: C. A. Worth
 Proofreaders:
 J. H. Frazier
 L. B. Wolfenson
 Stenographers:
 J. H. Sapiro
 R. H. Hillyer
 A. W. Galloway
 F. W. Spencer
 C. E. Mullen
 Fred Onstad
 C. B. MacCrossen
 R. W. Schlegel
 Typewriter Clerks:
 L. B. Webster
 O. P. Peterson
 W. A. Anderson
 C. R. Welton
 Sergeant-at-Arms: Russell C. Falconer
 Assistant Sergeant-at-Arms: T. H. Sanderson
 Document Clerk: Elmer A. Pierce
 Day Police: Olaf Goldsbrand
 Night Police: F. E. Boyle
 Laborer: John Eastman
 Postmaster: George Emerich
 Messengers: 
 E. G. Cooper
 Leon Grane
 Thomas Farley
 Roland Monroe
 Orville Swarthout
 Harry Cotey
 Myron Harshaw

Assembly employees
 Chief Clerk: C. E. Shaffer
 Journal Clerk: W. W. Jones
 Assistant Journal Clerk: S. E. Pearson
 Bookkeeper: S. S. Summers
 Assistant Bookkeeper: C. H. Dietz
 General Clerks: 
 W. J. Goldschmidt
 R. E. Van Matre
 Index Clerk: William L. Bullock
 Proofreaders and Enrolling Clerks:
 Max Schoetz
 E. V. Nevins
 Stenographers:
 March Polk
 A. J. Nelson
 A. J. Hughes
 D. J. Saposs
 L. T. Pond
 A. C. Tretow
 A. A. Heinrich
 C. J. Hartley
 A. C. Sheperd
 H. G. Pickering
 F. Robotka
 W. A. Lawton
 Statistical Stenographer: George Washington Blanchard
 Typewriters:
 L. L. Oeland
 J. C. Hawker
 H. G. Lee
 W. E. Kirk
 Sergeant-at-Arms: William S. Irvine
 Assistant Sergeant-at-Arms: Harry V. Ross
 Document Room Custodian: E. A. Hanks
 Assistant Document Room Custodian: C. E. Nelson
 Day Police: E. F. Wright
 Night Watch: H. S. Stevenson
 Night Laborer: E. Brackenwogen
 Postmaster: R. W. Cheever
 Post Office Messenger: C. F. Puls
 Messengers:
 Francis Lamb
 Harry E. Boyle
 H. Hawker
 A. B. Bonde
 A. L. Vogt
 Walter F. Vanderhyden
 Harry E. Benedict
 Frank J. Rief
 Lawrence Stoddard
 M. A. Goldberg
 Julius Hembre
 Paul E. Slawson
 J. A. Jerabeck
 H. O. Femrite

Notes

References

External links
 1909: Related Documents from Wisconsin Legislature

1909 in Wisconsin
1910 in Wisconsin
Wisconsin
Wisconsin legislative sessions